Marta Andrino (born June 14, 1987) is a Portuguese actress. She has starred in several telenovelas.

Biography 
She was born in Lisbon, capital city of Portugal. Her mother, Carla Andrino, is also an actress. Andrino studied theater in Brazil while her mother was part of the cast of Rede Globo's telenovela Negócio da China. She has a degree in marketing.

Career 
Marta Andrino started her career in 2006, when she played Paula Costa in SIC's television series Aqui não Há Quem Viva. Andrino guest starred in 2008, as Tatiana in the second-season episode Vida Dupla, of TVI's miniseries Casos da Vida. Marta Andrino and her mother played daughter and mother in 2008's TVI's telenovela A Outra. She played a rebel teenager named Catarina in TVI's telenovela Deixa que Te Leve from 2009 to 2010. Marta Andrino from 2010 to 2011 again starred in a telenovela with her mother, in TVI's telenovela Espírito Indomável, when she played Elisabete Ramos, while her mother played Josefa Ramos. The actress played the young Júlia in 2011, TVI's miniseries Redenção, and in the same year, she joined the cast of Morangos com Açúcar as the lead antagonist Verónica Lima. After her role as Eduarda in Doida Por Ti, she plays the antagonist Iolanda in the 2013, telenovela I Love It.

Filmography

Television

References

External links 
 

1987 births
Living people
Actresses from Lisbon
Portuguese television actresses